The British Meat Processors Association (BMPA) is a trade association that represents the meat processing industry in the UK.

Structure
It is headquartered in the north of the City of London, between City Thameslink railway station and St Bartholomew's Hospital, north of the eastern end of the A40 - Newgate Street and Holborn Viaduct on Cock Lane.

Function
It represents the meat industry in the UK.

References

External links
 BMPA

Food industry trade groups based in the United Kingdom
Meat processing in the United Kingdom
Organisations based in the City of London
Meat industry organizations